Karlodinium ballantinum is a species of unarmored dinoflagellates from the genus Karlodinium. It was first isolated from the Australian region of the Southern Ocean. It is small-sized and is characterized by its very short apical groove. It is considered potentially ichthyotoxic.

References

Further reading

External links

WORMS

Species described in 2008
Gymnodiniales